Prusy is a village and municipality in Bánovce nad Bebravou District in the Trenčín Region of north-western Slovakia.

History
In historical records the village was first mentioned in 1208.

Geography
The municipality lies at an altitude of 220 metres and covers an area of 7.520 km². It has a population of about 551 people.

References

External links
 Official page
http://www.statistics.sk/mosmis/eng/run.html

Villages and municipalities in Bánovce nad Bebravou District